Lajos Gulácsy (12 October 1882 – 21 February 1932) was a Hungarian painter with works collected by the Hungarian National Gallery. Heavily influenced by the Pre-Raphaelites, his rather dreamlike work is associated with Art Nouveau and Symbolism, but can also be considered a prelude to Surrealism.

References 

1882 births
1932 deaths
20th-century Hungarian painters
Hungarian male painters
20th-century Hungarian male artists